Adélaïde (or La Delaide) was a fourth-rate ship-of-the-line of the navy of Louis XIV, designed by François Couomb and launched in 1699 by the Toulon Dockyard. Between 1708 and 1714 she was chartered to several mercantile companies. She sank during a hurricane in October 1714 after having delivered slaves from West Africa to Saint-Domingue.

Career
Adélaïde was launched on 10 January 1699. Between January and May 1700 she was laid up at Toulon. She was fitted for sea duty between June and December. A report in 1702 stated that Adelaide sailed well.

In July 1707 Adelaide was among the many French naval vessels sunk at Toulon to protect them from British shell fire during the siege of Toulon. She was refloated in November.

Between 1708 to 1709 the Compagnie de Cap Nègre chartered Adelaide to carry wheat, after the severe winter of 1708 caused widespread famine in France and Spain during the War of Spanish Succession. The Compagnie got into financial difficulties in 1709 and had to sell its headquarters building, and may have gone bankrupt. 

In 1711 the Comagnie des Indies employed Adélaïde. She served in a small squadron under the command of Captain Roquemadure. She was laid up in 1712 at Port-Louis, Morbihan. On 11 March 1713 she was assessed as being fit for sea duty, and was fitted out. The Compagnie de l'Assiento chartered Adélaïde for the slave trade.

Slave voyage
Adélaïde, under the command of Captain de Champmoreau (or de Champmorant, or M. Champmorot) sailed from Lorient and started acquiring slaves in Africa on 1 February 1714. She acquired the slaves first at Whydah, and then at the port of Jacquin. Adélaïde arrived at Léogâne, Saint-Domingue with 300 slaves, who were sold there.

Loss
Adélaïde sailed from Saint-Domingue on 1 October 1714, bound for Havana. A cyclone caught her on 10 October at Cape Corrientes, wrecking her. By one account there were 45 survivors from her crew of 151 men; by another account, she had left France with 130 men and had suffered 78 crew deaths on her voyage. French records attribute all 78 deaths to her wrecking.

Post script
The underwater archaeologist Franck Goddio discovered Adélaïdes remains in 2003.

Notes, citations, and references
Notes

Citations

References
 
 

1690s ships
Ships built in France
Frigates of the French Navy
Slave ships
Maritime incidents in 1714